is a railway station in the city of Ueda, Nagano, Japan, operated by the private railway operating company Ueda Electric Railway.

Lines
Bessho-Onsen Station is the terminus of the Bessho Line and is 11.6 kilometers from the opposing terminus of the line at Ueda Station.

Station layout
The station consists of one ground-level side platform serving a single dead headed track. The station formerly had a bay platform, but one side of the platform is no longer in use. The station is one of the few stations on the line which is staffed.

History
The station opened on 17 June 1921. The current station building was remodeled in 1950.

Station numbering was introduced in August 2016 with Bessho-Onsen being assigned station number BE15.

Passenger statistics
In fiscal 2015, the station was used by an average of 609 passengers daily (boarding passengers only).

Surrounding area
Bessho-Onsen
Kitamuki Kannon
Anraku-ji (Ueda)

See also
 List of railway stations in Japan

References

External links

 

Railway stations in Japan opened in 1921
Railway stations in Nagano Prefecture
Ueda Electric Railway
Ueda, Nagano